Sweet Baby may refer to:

Sweet Baby (band)
Sweet Baby J'ai
"Sweet Baby" (George Duke & Stanley Clarke song), 1981
"Sweet Baby" (Ted Hawkins song), 1982
"Sweet Baby" (Macy Gray song), 2001
"Sweet Baby" (Erreway song), 2002
"Sweet Baby" (Scandal), the pilot episode of the television series, Scandal
"Sweet Baby", a song by Irving Berlin

See also
Sweet Baby James